Saint-Sulpice-de-Grimbouville is a commune in the Eure department in Normandy in northern France.

Until 1991, the name of the commune was spelled Saint-Sulpice-de-Graimbouville.

Population

See also
Communes of the Eure department

References

Communes of Eure